Peer Augustinski (25 June 1940 – 3 October 2014) was a German actor who specializes in television and dubbing.

Biography
Born in Berlin, Augustinski was best known as a cast member of Klimbim ("Odds and Ends"), one of the first successful comedy shows in German television, and as the official German dubbing artist of Robin Williams. With the exception of The Peddler in Aladdin, Augustinski dubbed all of Williams' film and television roles from late 1986 (starting with Seize the Day) to 2004.

He had a debilitating stroke in 2005 which prevented him from working as actively as before, but he was eventually able to dub Williams in a few more projects, the last being Night at the Museum: Battle of the Smithsonian in 2009.

Death
Augustinski died less than two months after Williams, on 3 October 2014, aged 74, after complications from epilepsy.

Live-action works
Klimbim (1976–1979, TV series, seasons 3–5)
Zwei himmlische Töchter (1978, TV series)
Unsere schönsten Jahre (1983)
Matt in 13 Zügen (1984, TV miniseries), as Peter Cranach
Derrick – season 11, episode 14: Stellen Sie sich vor, man hat Dr. Prestel erschossen (1984, TV), as Dr. Prestel
Drei gegen Drei (1985), as Brunnenmeier

Voice acting roles
The Adventures of Baron Munchausen (King of the Moon)
Aladdin (The Genie)
Anastasia (Bartok)
Asterix Conquers America (Asterix)
Awakenings (Doctor Malcolm Sayer)
Dead Again (Cozy Carlisle)
Dead Poets Society (John Keating)
Dumb and Dumber (Harry Dunne)
The Fisher King (Parry)
Flubber (Doctor Philip Brainard)
Good Morning, Vietnam (Adrian Cronauer)
Good Will Hunting (Sean Maguire)
Hook (Peter Banning/Peter Pan)
Mrs. Doubtfire (Daniel Hillard/Misses Euphegenia Doubtfire)
Raining Cats and Frogs (Fuchs)
The Santa Clause (Scott Calvin/Santa Claus)
Toy Story (Sheriff Woody)
Toy Story 2 (Sheriff Woody)
Toys (Leslie Zevo)

References

External links

German Dubbing Card Index

1940 births
2014 deaths
Deaths from epilepsy
German male television actors
German male voice actors
Male actors from Berlin
Neurological disease deaths in Germany
Sat.1 people
20th-century German male actors
21st-century German male actors